Giffoni may refer to:

Giffoni Sei Casali, Italian municipality of the Province of Salerno
Giffoni Valle Piana, Italian municipality of the Province of Salerno
Giffoni Film Festival, a children's film festival placed in Giffoni Valle Piana

See also
Giffone, an Italian municipality of the Province of Reggio Calabria